Children of the Corn II: The Final Sacrifice is a 1992 American supernatural horror slasher film and the sequel to the 1984 film Children of the Corn. Directed by David Price (son of studio chief Frank Price), it stars Terence Knox, Ryan Bollman, Ned Romero, and Paul Scherrer. The film was released on October 21, 1992 in Germany and in theatres by Dimension Films on January 29, 1993. The video release was handled by Paramount Pictures. This was the last film in the series to be released theatrically, as other sequels went on direct to video.

Plot
The plot involves the dark goings-on in Hemingford, Nebraska, a town near Gatlin, the original film's setting. Not long after the events of the first film, the people of Hemingford decide to adopt the surviving children from Gatlin and help them start new lives. The well-meaning locals are however unaware that the children return to the cornfield where one of the cult members, Micah, is possessed by He Who Walks Behind the Rows, the demonic entity the cult worships.

Caught in the middle are city reporter John Garrett and his son Danny, who are having a bitter falling-out over John's failed relationship with Danny's mother. John is in town working on a story about the children to save his downward-spiraling career. He runs into two of his former coworkers, Bobby Knite and fellow reporter Wayde McKenzie, who are on their way out of town. Later they are killed in a nearby cornfield after taking a shortcut in their van; a mysterious, powerful storm that lasts only minutes causes the surprisingly-sharp cornstalks to wreak havoc. Back in town, John meets bed-and-breakfast owner Angela Casual and they soon become lovers. Looking to distance himself from his father, Danny befriends orphaned local girl Lacey, who tells him some disturbing details about Gatlin.

Micah and the other children murder local woman Ruby Burke by sabotaging the hydraulic jacks supporting her house while she is underneath it, causing it to descend and crush her. Micah then kills another townsperson in the town, David Simpson, during church services with a knife and a wooden voodoo doll, which causes him to bleed to death from his nose. John starts to question the town doctor about what is going on, but the doctor acts suspiciously and asks John to leave. The doctor is later stabbed to death in his office by the children. Micah and the children later kill Mrs. Burke's sister, Mrs. West, in the road and make it look like she was struck by a car.

John partners with Frank Red Bear, a Native American professor at the state university, trying to make sense of the recent chaos and death. Frank leads John to ancient Native American rock paintings, telling him that Native Americans believed the area around Gatlin and Hemingford to hold special power which can magnify good or bad, and that children are especially vulnerable: Frank recites a story which tells of children killing their elders, but also how in the end with a funeral pyre a good spirit will emerge, further stipulating that the rock paintings show this has not yet come to pass.

As they investigate the local corn storage, they discover that town residents have been selling spoiled corn from the previous year's harvest along with the new crop to maximize profits. Growing on the spoiled corn is a dark-green acidic toxin which they believe is filling the town's air and contributing to a spate of delusions in the children, rendering them emotionless and violent. The Sheriff discovers them spying on the site, ties them up, and leaves them to be killed by a corn harvester, but they escape. Along the way, John questions Frank further about what's going on, with Frank telling how Native Americans believed in a spirit who would seek revenge for perceived wrongs done to the land, with He Who Walks Behind the Rows being this spirit.

The Sheriff and the rest of the Hemingford adults attend an emergency town-hall meeting to discuss the situation, but the children lock them inside and set the building afire, killing them all. The children then kidnap Angela and Lacey and take them out to the cornfield where they pressure a confused Danny to join them in sacrificing Lacey. John and Frank arrive driving the harvester. One of the children shoots Frank with an arrow, wounding him. Danny and John free Lacey and Angela and attempt to escape but the cornfield seems endless and they shortly return to where they started. Micah attempts to harness the power of He Who Walks Behind the Rows until Frank restarts the harvester, before he dies. Micah's robe gets caught in the machine and he calls for help. His face transforms, first into the demon that possessed him, then back to himself. Danny runs in to help him but is too late. The harvester pulls Micah in, killing him. The rest of the children scatter, and Danny, Angela, Lacey, and John leave the clearing.

John and Danny later reconcile as they burn Frank's body on traditional Native American funeral pyre, before they, Angela, and Lacey drive off together. Some time later, Frank is seen doing additions to the rock paintings to show that the story has come to pass, with his spirit having become the protector of the area.

Cast
 Terence Knox as John Garrett
 Paul Scherrer as Danny Garrett
 Ryan Bollman as Micah
 Christie Clark as Lacey Hellerstat
 Rosalind Allen as Angela Casual
 Ned Romero as Dr. Frank Red Bear
 Ed Grady as Dr. Richard Appleby
 Sean Bridgers as Jedediah
 Aubrey Dollar as Naomi Johnson

Production
Producers of the original Children of the Corn film, New World Pictures sold the rights to Trans-Atlantic Pictures.Film production began at the end of spring 1991, and shooting began in July in Liberty, North Carolina. Most of the cast were locals, including the children. The scene involving an elderly woman flying through a store window after her wheelchair becomes controlled by Micah was filmed in downtown Ramseur, North Carolina. The scene where Micah and the children of the corn burn the town elders was filmed in a home at the corner of Asheboro St. and Luther Ave. in Liberty. The home was burned for the film and a vacant lot remains where the house once stood. The production crew used a local parsonage at the corner of Fayetteville and Raleigh Sts. in Liberty as its headquarters during shooting. Brian Yuzna's son Xeno appears as one of the children of the corn.

In the DVD commentary, director David Price said during the shoot there was a local Christian group who held a few (low-key) protests during filming, and he received a dead rodent on his door step as a warning. As a result, the production constructed their own church for a few scenes in the film. Despite this, no actual incidents occurred.

Also in the DVD commentary, Price said the ending involving Red Bear painting a stone was added at the last minute. Originally, it involved John Garrett making a phone call to his tabloid at a phone booth by the side of the road near the cornfield, only to have it swallowed into the earth by He Who Walks Behind The Rows, killing him. This was scrapped due to budget constraints.

According to the original draft of the script, the film was going to be called Children of the Corn II: Deadly Harvest.

Release
Children of the Corn II: The Final Sacrifice was released in the US on January 29, 1993.  It made $2.7 million in its opening weekend and eventually grossed a total of $6,980,986 in the US.

The Canadian and European home video releases feature a slightly different musical score, and is missing the CGI sequence in the middle of the film.

Reception
Rotten Tomatoes, a review aggregator, reports that 22% of nine surveyed critics gave the film a positive review; the average rating is 2/10.

See also
 Children of the Corn (film series)
 List of adaptations of works by Stephen King

References

External links
 
 

1992 films
1992 horror films
Children of Corn 2
American sequel films
American slasher films
1990s English-language films
Children of the Corn
Miramax films
Dimension Films films
Films about cults
Films about religion
Films set in 1983
Films set in Nebraska
Films shot in North Carolina
Films scored by Daniel Licht
Films directed by David Price
1990s American films